Herber is a German surname. Notable people with the surname include:

Arnie Herber, American football quarterback
Johannes Herber, German basketball player 
Keith Herber, American author, editor, and musician
Mark D. Herber, British author
Maxi Herber, German figure skater
Oliver Herber, German footballer
Veronica Herber, New Zealand artist 

German-language surnames